Park Patrol is a video game designed by Tony Ngo and game published in 1984 by Activision for the Commodore 64. It was later released for the Amstrad CPC and ZX Spectrum. Players control a park ranger with a choice of a male or female character. The goal is to tidy up rubbish from the waters of the lake and the shoreline.

Gameplay
The ranger can walk on the shore or use an inflatable dinghy with an outboard motor to go into the water.

Turtles kill on contact. If one falls into the water it can be rescued for points but turn into a fast-moving green turtle if left for too long.

Snakes lurk in the water and can puncture the dinghy. They can be scared away temporarily by dropping snake repellent (at the cost of energy).

Swimmers can be rescued when calling for help.

Ants steel food from the hut, which can be recovered by bumping into them from the side (and killed by knocking them into the water).

On the shore is the ranger's hut, which contains food to top up energy. A plant near the hut grows every time the ranger walks into it. When it flowers, the ranger gets a short period of immunity.

By approaching at the right angle, the ranger can jump out of the dinghy and land on floating lots, starting a logrolling mini-game.

Once all the litter is collected, a bonus is awarded based on energy remaining.

External links

Park Patrol at GameFAQs

1984 video games
Activision games
Amstrad CPC games
Commodore 64 games
Telecomsoft games
ZX Spectrum games
Single-player video games
Video games featuring protagonists of selectable gender
Video games developed in the United States